Sparisoma is a genus of parrotfishes native to warmer parts of the Atlantic. FishBase recognizes 15 species in this genus, including S. rocha described from Trindade Island in 2010 and S. choati described from the East Atlantic in 2012. They are the most important grazers of algae in the Caribbean Sea, especially since sea urchins, especially Diadema, the other prominent consumers of algae, have been reduced in many places by a recent epidemic.

The name was proposed by William John Swainson as a subgenus of Scarus. Sparus in Latin is a golden-headed fish, and soma means "body". The common spelling Sparisomus is incorrect.

Members of this genus are sequential hermaphrodites, starting as females (known as the initial phase) and then changing to males (the terminal phase). However, some males are direct-developing, and these usually resemble the initial phase. These direct-developing and terminal phase males often display different mating strategies. In most species, the terminal phase is more colourful than the initial, but a notable exception to this rule is S. cretense. They use their pectoral fins to move; the caudal fin is reserved for rapid bursts of speed.

The genus Sparisoma is fairly successful, but populations have been falling somewhat because of overfishing and other human activities. However, as mentioned above, it is the main grazer of algae, but since populations have been falling, the coral reefs may be at risk, because too much algae is deleterious to coral.

Species
 Sparisoma amplum (Ranzani, 1842)  (Reef parrotfish)
 Sparisoma atomarium (Poey, 1861) (Greenblotch parrotfish)
 Sparisoma aurofrenatum (Valenciennes, 1840) (Redband parrotfish)
 Sparisoma axillare (Steindachner, 1878) (Gray parrotfish)
 Sparisoma choati Rocha, Brito & D. R. Robertson, 2012 (West-African parrotfish)
 Sparisoma chrysopterum (Bloch & Schneider, 1801) (Redtail parrotfish)
 Sparisoma cretense (Linnaeus, 1758) (Mediterranean parrotfish)
 Sparisoma frondosum (Agassiz, 1831) (Agassiz's parrotfish)
 Sparisoma griseorubrum Cervigón, 1982 (Caribbean reef parrotfish)
 Sparisoma radians (Valenciennes, 1840) (Bucktooth parrotfish)
 Sparisoma rocha Pinheiro, Gasparini & Sazima, 2010 (Rocha's parrotfish)
 Sparisoma rubripinne (Valenciennes, 1840) (Redfin parrotfish)
 Sparisoma strigatum (Günther, 1862) (Strigate parrotfish)	
 Sparisoma tuiupiranga Gasparini, Joyeux & Floeter, 2003 (Brazilian red parrotfish)
 Sparisoma viride (Bonnaterre, 1788) (Stoplight parrotfish)

Type species
William John Swainson described the genus Sparisoma in 1839 and he designated Sparus abildgaardi as its type species, Although the specific name abildgaardi would appear to have precedence over chrysopterum, the latter is the more widely used name and the former was long mistakenly thought to be synonymous with Sparisoma viride. The name Sparus abildgaardi was suppressed by the International Commission on Zoological Nomenclature and Scarus chrysopterus was recognised as the type species.

References

 
Scaridae
Extant Eocene first appearances
Marine fish genera
Taxa named by William John Swainson